Terelle is a comune (municipality) in the Province of Frosinone in the Italian region Lazio, located about  southeast of Rome and about  east of Frosinone.

Terelle borders the following municipalities: Atina, Belmonte Castello, Casalattico, Cassino, Colle San Magno, Piedimonte San Germano, Sant'Elia Fiumerapido, Villa Santa Lucia.

References

External links
 digilander.libero.it/terelle/

Cities and towns in Lazio